Vladimir Dalakliev  (born January 29, 1992) is a Bulgarian taekwondo athlete who was a bronze medalist of the 2017 World Taekwondo Championships after being defeated by Lee Dae-hoon.

References 

Living people
1992 births
Bulgarian male taekwondo practitioners
European Games competitors for Bulgaria
Taekwondo practitioners at the 2015 European Games
World Taekwondo Championships medalists
Competitors at the 2017 Summer Universiade